This is a list of commentators who currently work or have worked for Fox Sports.

Major League Baseball

Play-by-Play
 Joe Davis
 Adam Amin
 Aaron Goldsmith
 Kenny Albert
 Len Kasper
 Don Orsillo
 Jeff Levering
 Cory Provus

Color Commentators
 John Smoltz
 A. J. Pierzynski
 Eric Karros
 C. J. Nitkowski
 Tom Verducci

Field Reporters
 Ken Rosenthal
 Tom Verducci
 Jon Paul Morosi

Studio Host
 Kevin Burkhardt
 Mike Hill (fill-in)
 Chris Myers (fill-in)
 Matt Vasgersian (fill-in)
 Noah Eagle (fill-in)

Studio Analysts
 Frank Thomas
 Dontrelle Willis
 David Ortiz (All-Star Game and postseason only)
 Alex Rodriguez (All-Star Game and postseason only)

Former
 Bob Brenly
 Bret Boone
 Joe Buck
 Eric Byrnes (2006, 2007 World Series Pre–Game Studio Analyst)
 Chip Caray (studio host from 1996 to 1998; play–by–play announcer from 1999 to 2000)
 Jim Deshaies
 Ray Fosse
 Tim McCarver
 Luis Gonzalez
 Rex Hudler
 Eric Karros (2007 World Series Pre–Game Studio Analyst)
 John Kruk
 Al Leiter
 Kenny Lofton (studio analyst for 2005 ALCS & NLCS)
 Steve Lyons (studio analyst from 1996 to 2000; game analyst from 2001 to 2006)
 Dan McLaughlin
 Keith Olbermann (studio host from 1999 to 2000)
 Patrick O'Neal (substitute studio host in August 2005; Zelasko was on maternity leave)
 Jim Palmer
 Lou Piniella
 Mel Proctor
 Frank Robinson
 John Rooney
 Daron Sutton
 Chris Welch
 Dave Winfield (studio analyst in 1996)
 Kevin Kennedy
 Jeanne Zelasko
 Mario Impemba
 Rod Allen
 Thom Brennaman
 Dave Henderson

Fox Soccer

Current
 Kate Abdo
 Ben Andrews
 Glenn Davis
 JP Dellacamera
 Jenn Hildreth
 Francisco X. Rivera
 Rob Stone
 John Strong
 Jenny Taft

NASCAR

Current
 Vince Welch 2015–present
 Mike Joy
 Larry McReynolds
 Michael Waltrip
 Chris Myers
 Phil Parsons Truck Series races 2007–present
 Jamie Little 2015–present
 Shannon Spake 2017–present
 Regan Smith
 Jamie McMurray
 Clint Bowyer

Former
 Jeanne Zelasko (2001–06)
 Dick Berggren (2001–12)
 Jeff Hammond 2001–14)
 Matt Yocum (2001–2020)
 Krista Voda (2007–14)
 Steve Byrnes (2001-2015)
 Darrell Waltrip (2001-2019)
 Hermie Sadler (2011-2019)
 Jeff Gordon (2016–2022)

National Football League

In–studio personalities
 James Brown (Studio host, 1994–2005) 
 Terry Bradshaw (Analyst, 1994–present)
 Howie Long (Analyst, 1994–present)
 Jimmy Johnson (Analyst, 1994–95 & 2002–present)
 Ronnie Lott (Analyst, 1996–97)
 Cris Collinsworth (Analyst, 1998–2001)
 Jimmy Kimmel (Prognostication, 1999–2002; joined by "Cousin Sal" Iacono in 2002)
 Frank Caliendo (Prognostication, 2003–12)
 Jim Cantore (Weather, 1999)
 Jillian Barberie (Weather, 2000–present)
 Joe Buck (Pre–game studio host, 2006) 
 Curt Menefee (Studio Host, 2006–present)
 Michael Strahan (Analyst, 2008–present)

In–game commentators

Top Broadcast Teams (in order of prominence as of 2022)
 Kevin Burkhardt/Greg Olsen/Erin Andrews/Tom Rinaldi (America’s Game of the Week)
 Joe Davis/Daryl Johnston/Pam Oliver
 Adam Amin/Mark Schlereth/Kristina Pink
 Kenny Albert/Jonathan Vilma/Shannon Spake
 Kevin Kugler/Mark Sanchez/Laura Okmin
 Chris Myers/Robert Smith/Jen Hale
 Brandon Gaudin/Brady Quinn/Megan Olivi (select games)

Rotating Commentators:
 Tim Brando
 Noah Eagle
 Dan Hellie
 Aaron Goldsmith
 Matt Millen

Former announcers
 Troy Aikman (2002–21, "#1 team" analyst) 2002-21
 Marcus Allen
 Jill Arrington (sideline reporter)
 Doug Bell
 Ray Bentley
 Carter Blackburn
 Mike Breen
 Thom Brenneman
 Joe Buck (2002–21, "#1 team" announcer) 2002-21
 Steve Buckhantz
 Jim Burt
 Steve Byrnes
 Mark Carrier
 Scott Case
 Dwight Clark
 Eric Clemons
 Brian Custer
 Cris Collinsworth (2002–04, "#1 team" analyst 2002–04)
 Spero Dedes
 Terry Donahue
 Steve Doocy (sideline reporter)
 Jason Garrett
 Jerry Glanville
 Jay Glazer (sideline reporter)
 Drew Goodman
 Scott Graham
 Tim Green
 Howard Griffith
 Nick Halling
 Dale Hellestrae
 Merril Hoge
 Greg Jennings
 Dan Jiggetts (sideline reporter)
 D. J. Johnson (sideline reporter)
 Gus Johnson
 Sean Jones
 John Jurkovic
 Paul Kennedy
 Erik Kramer
 Dave Kreig
 Jeff Lageman
 Dave Lapham
 Marv Levy
 Josh Lewin
 Ronnie Lott
 Bill Maas
 John Madden (1994–2001, "#1 team" analyst)
 Trevor Matich
 Matt Millen
 Dan Miller
 Anthony Muñoz
 Karl Nelson
 Neil O'Donnell
 Jesse Palmer
 Dave Pasch
 J. C. Pearson
 Andre Reed
 Bill Romanowski
 Chris Rose
 Sam Rosen
 Tim Ryan
 Craig Shemon
 Billy Ray Smith
 Butch Stearns (sideline reporter)
 Kelly Stouffer
 Pat Summerall (1994–2006, "#1 team" announcer 1994–2001)
 Aqib Talib
 Matt Vasgersian
 Dave Wannstedt (2004)
 Amy Van Dyken (sideline reporter)
 Jeanne Zelasko (sideline reporter)

National Hockey League

Studio personnel
 James Brown
 Terry Crisp
 Suzy Kolber
 Dave Maloney

Broadcasters

Play–by–Play
 Kenny Albert
 Mike Emrick
 Pat Foley
 Randy Hahn
 Rick Jeanneret
 Mike Lange
 Josh Lewin
 Jiggs McDonald
 Howie Rose
 Sam Rosen
 Dick Stockton
 Dave Strader

Color commentators
 John Davidson
 Mike Eruzione
 John Kelly
 Peter McNab
 Joe Micheletti
 Greg Millen
 Darren Pang
 Denis Potvin
 Daryl Reaugh
 Mickey Redmond
 Craig Simpson
 Paul Steigerwald
 Pete Stemkowski
 Petros Papadakis
 Mark Helfrich
 Ben Leber

College football

Studio personnel

Studio Hosts
 Rob Stone

Studio Analysts
 Matt Leinart
 Reggie Bush
 Brady Quinn
 Urban Meyer
 Bruce Feldman (insider)
 Charles Woodson (occasional appearances)
 Clay Travis (contributor)

Broadcasters

Play–by–Play
 Gus Johnson (Lead Play by Play)
 Tim Brando 
 Jason Benetti
 Noah Eagle
 Alex Faust

Color commentators
 Joel Klatt (Lead)
 Spencer Tillman
 Brock Huard
 Petros Papadakis

Sideline reporter
 Jenny Taft (Lead Sideline reporter)
 Allison Williams

See also
 Fox Footy Channel
 Fox Sports Radio

References

F